Parliamentary elections were held in Bulgaria on 8 June 1986.  The Fatherland Front, dominated by the Bulgarian Communist Party, was the only organization to contest the election; all candidate lists had to be approved by the Front. The Front nominated one candidate for each constituency. Of the 400 candidates 276 were members of the Communist Party, 99 were members of the Bulgarian Agrarian National Union and the remaining 25 were unaffiliated. Voter turnout was reportedly 99.5%.

Results

References

Bulgaria
1986 in Bulgaria
Parliamentary elections in Bulgaria
One-party elections
Single-candidate elections
1986 elections in Bulgaria
June 1986 events in Europe